Douglas Allan Zmolek (born November 3, 1970) is an American former professional ice hockey defenseman who played in the NHL for eight seasons between 1992 and 2000.

Playing career
Zmolek graduated from John Marshall High School in 1989. He was drafted seventh overall by the Minnesota North Stars in the 1989 NHL Entry Draft held in Minnesota. Zmolek attended the University of Minnesota of the WCHA and was named to the WCHA Second All-Star Team and the NCAA Second All-American Team in his junior, and final, year in 1992.

Zmolek made his debut in the NHL in the 1992–93 season with the San Jose Sharks after he was earlier acquired from the North Stars in the dispersal draft on May 30, 1991. In his second year, Zmolek was traded back to the Stars franchise which had relocated to Dallas.

As a physical stay-at-home defenseman, Zmolek spent parts of two seasons with Dallas before stints with the Los Angeles Kings and Chicago Blackhawks. Zmolek retired after receiving a buyout during the 2000–01 season after playing two games with the Chicago Wolves of the IHL.

Zmolek played 467 career NHL games, scoring 11 goals and 53 assists for 64 points and registering 905 penalty minutes.

Since retirement, Zmolek has supported the Rochester Youth Hockey Association (RYHA) as an advisor and member of the board. He also runs an off-season hockey camp, Top Shelf, in Rochester, MN. He has three sons, Riese, William, and Bennett, who all play hockey, and a daughter, Ella.

Awards and honors

Career statistics

Regular season and playoffs

International

References

External links
 

1970 births
Living people
American men's ice hockey defensemen
Chicago Blackhawks players
Chicago Wolves (IHL) players
Dallas Stars players
Ice hockey players from Minnesota
Los Angeles Kings players
Minnesota Golden Gophers men's ice hockey players
Minnesota North Stars draft picks
National Hockey League first-round draft picks
San Jose Sharks players
Sportspeople from Rochester, Minnesota
AHCA Division I men's ice hockey All-Americans